Devil's Force is the second album of Swedish black metal band Nifelheim. It was released in 1998 on CD and LP.

Track listing
"Deathstrike from Hell" – 3:48
"The Final Slaughter" – 4:45
"Desecration of the Dead" – 4:48
"Demonic Evil" – 3:16
"Satanic Mass" – 4:49
"Soldier of Satan" – 3:54
"Devil's Force" – 3:43
"Hellish Blasphemy" – 3:02

Personnel
Hellbutcher (Per Gustavsson) - vocals
Tyrant (Erik Gustavsson) – bass, guitar
John Zwetsloot – guitar 
Jon Nödtveidt – guitar
Demon (??) – drums

References

External links

Nifelheim albums
1997 albums